Gandharvakottai block is a revenue block in Pudukkottai district, Tamil Nadu, India. It has a total of 36 panchayat villages.

Villages of Gandharvakottai block 
 	Akkachipatti 
 	Andanoor  
       Aravampatti 
 	Ariyanipatti 
 	Athangaraividuthi 
 	Gandarvakottai 
 	Kallakottai 
 	Kattunaval 
 	Komapuram 
 	Kulathur 
 	Kurumpoondi 
 	Manganur 
 	Manjapettai 
 	Mattangal 
 	Mudhukulam 
 	Nadupatti 
 	Nambooranpatti 
 	Nathamadipatti 
 	Neppugai 
 	Nodiyur 
 	Palaiya Gandarvakottai 
 	Pallavarayanpatti 
 	Periyakottai 
 	Pisanathur 
 	Pudunagar 
 	Pudupatti, Pudukkottai 
 	Punalkulam 
 	Sangamviduthi 
 	Sundampatti 
 	Thatchankurichi 
 	Thurusupatti 
 	Thuvar
   Vadugapatti 
 	Veeradipatti 
 	Velalaviduthi 
 	Viralipatti

References 

 

Revenue blocks of Pudukkottai district